Jin Dajian is a fictional character in Water Margin, one of the Four Great Classical Novels in Chinese literature. Nicknamed "Jade Armed Craftsman", he ranks 66th among the 108 Stars of Destiny and 30th among the 72 Earthly Fiends.

Background
Jin Dajian is an engraver from Jizhou (濟州; around present-day Jining and Heze, Shandong) whose exquisite skill in carving seals, stone tablets and designs on jade earns him the nickname "Jade Armed Craftsman".  He has known Wu Yong of Liangshan before the latter joins the stronghold.

Becoming an outlaw
When Song Jiang is in Jiangzhou (江州; present-day Jiujiang, Jiangxi), where he is exiled for killing his mistress Yan Poxi, he could move in and out of prison freely with permission of the chief warden Dai Zong, a friend of Wu Yong. One day he gets drunk in a restaurant alone. Lamenting his misfortunes, he writes a seditious poem on a wall in the restaurant, which he forgets the next day. Huang Wenbing, a petty official, discovers the poem and reports it to Cai Jiu, the governor of Jiangzhou, leading to Song being locked up and flogged. Cai Jiu orders Dai Zong to take a letter to his father Grand Tutor Cai Jing in the imperial capital Dongjing (東京; present-day Kaifeng, Henan) as he needs the latter's advice on how to deal with the matter.

Dai Zong passes by Liangshan and is drugged in an inn of the stronghold run by Zhu Gui. Zhu discovers Cai Jiu's letter on Dai and takes him to the bandit chiefs, who learn from Dai the plight of Song Jiang. Wu Yong suggests fooling Cai Jiu to send Song to Dongjing, so that the bandits could rescue him when he is on the way. To forge a letter from Cai Jing requires the help of the scholar Xiao Rang, who could imitate the Grand Tutor's handwriting, and the craftsman Jin Dajian, who could replicate Cai's personal seal. Dai Zong travels to the homes of the two men, who are told their skills are needed for the renovation of a temple. They are lured to the vicinity of Liangshan and taken to the stronghold. Finding themselves trapped, Jin and Xiao have no choice but join Liangshan. They create the fake letter as instructed by Wu Yong.

But the seal affixed to the letter happens to be one not appropriate for correspondence between fathers and sons. The letter fools Cai Jiu but not Huang Wenbing, who points out the giveaway. Cai Jiu orders Song Jiang and Dai Zong be executed. Meanwhile, having realised the mistake, Wu Yong sends many chieftains to Jiangzhou, where they save the two just before they are beheaded.

Campaigns
Jin Dajian is placed in charge of all the engraving works, particularly carving of seals, after the 108 Stars of Destiny came together in what is called the "Grand Assembly". He participates in the campaigns against the Liao invaders and rebel forces in Song territory following amnesty from Emperor Huizong for Liangshan.

In the attack on Jingnan (荊南; around present-day Jingzhou, Hubei) in the campaign against Wang Qing, Xiao Rang, Jin Dajian and Pei Xuan are captured by the enemy. The three refuse to surrender and divulge any information under torture. They are freed when Xiao Jiasui and others revolt against Wang, causing Jingnan to fall.

Before the Liangshan heroes go on their last campaign, which targets Fang La, Emperor Huizong summons Jin Dajian to the palace, where he is retained as an imperial craftsman. He stays in that job for the rest of his life.

References
 
 
 
 
 
 
 

72 Earthly Fiends
Fictional sculptors
Fictional characters from Shandong